McMahon is a hamlet in Coulee Rural Municipality No. 136, Saskatchewan, Canada. The hamlet is located on Saskatchewan Highway 379, about 40 km southeast of Swift Current.

See also

 List of communities in Saskatchewan
 Hamlets of Saskatchewan
 Poverty Valley Aerodrome

References

Former villages in Saskatchewan
Unincorporated communities in Saskatchewan
Coulee No. 136, Saskatchewan